Wilson J. Vance (December 20, 1845 - November 10, 1911) was an American soldier who fought for the Union Army during the American Civil War and an author. He received the Medal of Honor for valor.

Biography
Vance served in the American Civil War in the 21st Ohio Infantry. He received the Medal of Honor on September 17, 1897 for his actions on January 3, 1863 at the Battle of Stones River (December 31, 1862 - January 3, 1863.)

Medal of Honor citation
Rank and organization: Private, Company B, 21st Ohio Infantry. Place and date: At Murfreesboro, TN., 31 December 1862. Entered service at:------. Birth: Ohio. Date of Issue: 17 September 1897.

Citation:

Voluntarily and under a heavy fire, while his command was falling back, rescued a wounded and helpless comrade from death or capture.

See also

List of American Civil War Medal of Honor recipients: T-Z

References

External links
 Military Times
 
 
 

1845 births
1911 deaths
Union Army soldiers
United States Army Medal of Honor recipients
American Civil War recipients of the Medal of Honor